Ambapani is a small village/hamlet in Thethaitangar block, Simdega District, Jharkhand state, India. It comes under Ambapani panchayat.

History

Geography

Taraboga (9 km), Rajabasa (11 km), Ghutbahar (14 km), Tukupani (15 km), Meromdega (15 km) are the villages situated near Ambapani. It is surrounded by Bolba Block to its west, Bansjore Block to its east, Biramitrapur Block to its east and Simdega Block to its north. 

Simdega, Biramitrapur, Rajagangapur and Raurkela are the nearby cities.

References

Villages in Simdega district